Samir Guesmi (born 7 October 1967) is a French actor. He has appeared in more than 90 films and television shows since 1988.

Filmography

Actor

Filmmaker

Theatre

References

External links

 

1967 births
Living people
French male film actors
French male television actors
Male actors from Paris
French people of Algerian descent
20th-century French male actors
21st-century French male actors
French film directors
French male screenwriters
French screenwriters